This is a list of undisputed champions in professional boxing. Eras that are not listed do not have any undisputed champions.

Championship recognition 
Titles have been awarded by:
New York State Athletic Commission (NYSAC), founded in 1920
World Boxing Association (WBA), founded in 1921 as the National Boxing Association (NBA); re-named to the WBA in 1962
World Boxing Council (WBC), founded in 1963
International Boxing Federation (IBF), founded in 1983
World Boxing Organization (WBO), founded in 1988

Criteria 
1921–1963, a boxer who held both the NYSAC and NBA (WBA) world titles simultaneously
1963–1983, a boxer who held both the WBA and WBC world titles simultaneously
1983–2007, a boxer who held the WBA, WBC, and IBF world titles simultaneously
2007–present, a boxer who holds the WBA, WBC, IBF and WBO world titles simultaneously

Heavyweight

NYSAC–NBA era (1921–1963)

WBA–WBC era (1963–1983)

WBA–WBC–IBF era (1983–2007)

Cruiserweight

WBA–WBC–IBF era (1983–2007)

WBA–WBC–IBF–WBO era (2007–present)

Light heavyweight

NYSAC–NBA era (1921–1963)

WBA–WBC era (1963–1983)

WBA–WBC–IBF era (1983–2007)

Super middleweight

WBA–WBC–IBF–WBO era (2007–present)

Middleweight

NYSAC–NBA era (1921–1963)

WBA–WBC era (1963–1983)

WBA–WBC–IBF era (1983–2007)

Light middleweight

WBA–WBC era (1963–1983)

WBA–WBC–IBF era (1983–2007)

WBA–WBC–IBF–WBO era (2007–present)

Welterweight

NYSAC–NBA era (1921–1963)

WBA–WBC era (1963–1983)

WBA–WBC–IBF era (1983–2007)

Light welterweight

NYSAC–NBA era (1921–1963)

WBA–WBC era (1963–1983)

WBA–WBC–IBF era (1983–2007)

WBA–WBC–IBF–WBO era (2007–present)

Lightweight

NYSAC–NBA era (1921–1963)

WBA–WBC era (1963–1983)

WBA–WBC–IBF era (1983–2007)

WBA–WBC–IBF–WBO era (2007–present)

Super featherweight

NYSAC–NBA era (1921–1963)

WBA–WBC era (1963–1983)

Featherweight

NYSAC–NBA era (1922–1963)

WBA–WBC era (1963–1983)

Super bantamweight

To date, there has never been an undisputed champion in this division.

Bantamweight

NYSAC–NBA era (1921–1963)

WBA–WBC era (1963–1983)

WBA–WBC–IBF–WBO era (2007–present)

Super flyweight

To date, there has never been an undisputed champion in this division.

Flyweight

NYSAC–NBA era (1921–1963)

WBA–WBC era (1963–1983)

Light flyweight

To date, there has never been an undisputed champion in this division.

Mini flyweight

To date, there has never been an undisputed champion in this division.

See also
List of current world boxing champions
List of WBA world champions
List of WBC world champions
List of IBF world champions
List of WBO world champions
List of The Ring world champions

References

External links

BoxRec Official Website
IBHOF website
World Titles (State Athletic Commission; pre-WBC)
National / World Boxing Association(1921 - )
International Boxing Federation(1983 - )
World Boxing Organization(1988 - )

Undisputed
Undisputed